The Scotiabank Photography Award is a  annual Canadian photography award. Two runners-up each receive . In addition to the cash prize, the prize consists of a solo-exhibition of their work and the publication of a book about the work. It is intended to support a Canadian mid-to-late career lens-based artists, aiming to take that career to a higher level of national and international recognition. The award was co-founded in 2010 by Canadian photographer Edward Burtynsky and Jane Nokes. The longlist is announced in January and the short list is announced in March. The winner is announced in early May during the Scotiabank Contact Photography Festival.

Recipients

References

External links 
The Scotiabank Photography Award

Awards established in 2011
Photography awards